Trombone Atrevido is the third solo album by trombonist Achilles Liarmakopoulos released in 2015 by ODEG label.
It's dedicated to choro music of Brazil.

Musicians 
 Achilles Liarmakopoulos: trombone
 Spiros Exaras: guitar
 Vitor Goncalvez: accordion
 Bam Bam Rodriguez: bass
 Helio Alves: piano
 Rogerio Boccato: pandeiro
 Felipe Fournier: vibes

Production 
 Producer: Spiros Exaras
 Executive Producer: Achilles Liarmakopoulos
 Engineer: Lou Scapino
 Mixing: Dixon Van Winkle
 Mastering: Bernie Grundman

Track listing
 "Trombone Atrevido" - Pixinguinha
 "Choinho do sol" - Spiros Exaras
 "Andre de sapato novo" - Andre Victor Correa
 "Desprezado" - Pixinguinha
 "Amor e medo - Zequinha Abreu
 "Chorei" - Pixinguinha & Benedito Lacerda
 "Cavaquinho Seresteiro" - Waldir Azevedo
 "Choro N.1 (Choro Tipico)" - Heitor Villa-Lobos
 "Ave Maria" - 
 "Canto em rodeio" - Pixinguinha
 "Cordas Romanticas" - Waldir Azevedo
 "Chora Trombone" - Jose Da Silva
 "Ternura" - K-Ximbinho

References

2015 albums
Tango albums